Aahista Aahista is a Pakistani drama produced by Momina Duraid under their banner MD Productions. It is written by Aliya Bukhari and directed by Haseeb Hassan and starring Adnan Siddiqui, Sarwat Gillani and Mawra Hocane.

A dubbed version of the serial is currently broadcasting by Hum Pashto 1 as میدہ میدہ.

Plot 
Zawaar (Adnan Siddiqui) is a Pakistani man living in California and happily married to Sophia (Sarwat Gillani), an Anglo Indian girl. Zawaar’s family i.e. his mother Bee Jaan (Saba Hameed) in Pakistan is unaware of his marriage with Sophia. Things take a new turn when Zawaar returns Pakistan to see the ailing Bee Jaan. Unaware of Zawaar's relation with Sophia, Bee Jaan and Zawwar’s sister insist him to marry her niece Haya (Mawra Hocane). How will Zawwar manages this challenge, will he leave the Haya or divorced to Sophee?

Cast 
Adnan Siddiqui as Zawaar
Mawra Hocane as Haya
Sarwat Gilani Sophia (Sophee)
Saba Hameed as Bi Jaan
Behroze Sabzwari
Hina Khawaja Bayat
Javed Sheikh
Shehroz Sabzwari as Mustafa
Annie Zaidi as Safia
 Mehr Jaffri

See also 
 List of programs broadcast by Hum TV

References

External links 
 Hum TV official website

2014 Pakistani television seasons
Pakistani television series endings